William Lee Springer (April 12, 1909 – September 20, 1992) was a U.S. Representative from Illinois.

Born in Sullivan, Indiana, Springer attended the public schools and Sullivan and Culver Military Academy at Culver, Indiana. DePauw University, Greencastle, Indiana, B.A., 1931. He graduated from the law school of the University of Illinois, LL.B., in 1935. He was admitted to the bar in 1935 and commenced the practice of law in 1936 in Champaign, Illinois. He was the state's attorney of Champaign County, Illinois from 1940 to 1942. He served in the United States Navy from March 1942 as an officer, with nineteen months' foreign duty, until discharged as a lieutenant in the Naval Reserve on September 22, 1945. He was a county judge in Champaign County from 1946 to 1950.

Springer was elected as a Republican to the Eighty-second and to the ten succeeding Congresses (January 3, 1951 – January 3, 1973). He was not a candidate for reelection in 1972 to the Ninety-third Congress. He served as a member of the Federal Power Commission, May 1973 – December 1975. He served as a member of the Federal Election Commission from May 1976 to March 1979. Springer voted in favor of the Civil Rights Acts of 1957, 1960, 1964, and 1968, as well as the 24th Amendment to the U.S. Constitution and the Voting Rights Act of 1965. He was a resident of Champaign, Illinois until his death on September 20, 1992.

References

1909 births
1992 deaths
Federal Power Commission
Members of the Federal Election Commission
Culver Academies alumni
DePauw University alumni
University of Illinois alumni
United States Navy officers
Republican Party members of the United States House of Representatives from Illinois
People from Sullivan, Indiana
People from Champaign, Illinois
20th-century American politicians
University of Illinois College of Law alumni
Ford administration personnel
Carter administration personnel